Leonora Sanvitale (Contessa di Scandiano) (c. 1558–1582) was a noblewoman and singer at the Este court at Ferrara, and along with her stepmother Barbara Sanseverino, was among the most "brilliant" noblewomen at the court. She joined the court in 1576 when she married Giulio Tiene, Count of Scandiano. Before this she had been at the court in Parma. Previously she had attracted the attention of both Torquato Tasso and the Duke of Rome in 1573. She was a member of the first incarnation of the concerto delle donne and sang in the court's musica secreta.

References
Newcomb, Anthony. The Madrigal at Ferrara, 1579-1597. Princeton University Press, Princeton, NJ. (1980)

1550s births
1582 deaths
Nobility from Ferrara
16th-century Italian singers
16th-century Italian women singers
Musicians from Ferrara